Todoque was a locality belonging to the municipality of Los Llanos de Aridane, located in the southwest of the island of La Palma, Canary Islands. Its main neighborhoods were Todoque, Los Pasitos and Todoque de Arriba. The town was first badly damaged and many buildings destroyed by the Cumbre Vieja vulcano eruption in September 2021, which ended up engulfing it entirely.

Toponymy 
Todoque became a district of Los Llanos de Aridane with the name of Tedoque, both popularly and officially until the beginning of the 20th century. Its name comes from the aboriginal language, specifically from the word tedote. Most likely the Auritas distinguished between bare mountain ten/tene(r) and mountain covered with brush, tedote in reference to the volcano covered with scrub or volcanic cone that is located in Todoque. Also with the word ten/tene/tener have there is a rich toponymy that comes from the aboriginal language: Tenibucar, Tenerra, Tinizara (<Tenizara), Tenisca, Teneguía, Tendiña, Tenerife (white mountain). Abreu Galindo says: «The natives of the island of La Palma, gave it this name, Tenerife, made up of two dictions: tener, which means mountain and (sic) ife, which is white».

History
At the end of the 15th century, the area was part of the aboriginal canton of Tihuya, which stretched from the canton of Aridane to the mountain of Tamanca. It would cover the areas known as Tajuya, Todoque, Puerto Naos, La Laguna and part of Las Manchas. 

In September and October 2021, its territory was affected by the Cumbre Vieja volcanic eruption. On September 21, the lava flow reached the town and during the following days hundreds of buildings were destroyed, including the church of Saint Pius X, the health center, the headquarters of the neighborhood association, the School of Early Childhood Education, and Los Campitos Elementary School and the Todoque Elementary and the Infant Education School. On October 10, new lava flows destroyed the buildings that were still standing, leaving the town practically erased from the map.

Culture
Iglesia de San Pío X, burned and collapsed by the lava flow on 26 September 2021.

References

External links

Populated places in La Palma
Former populated places in Spain
Destroyed towns
Populated places disestablished in 2021
2021 disestablishments in Spain